Anthony Lyons (born June 1967) is a British property investor. He is the co-founder of Matterhorn Capital and Chairman of Future Energy Solutions.

Early life
Anthony Lyons was born in June 1967.

Career
With Simon Conway, Lyons is the co-founder of the Matterhorn Capital, a property investment company.

In 2004, Lyons and Conway purchased properties in Earl's Court and Olympia for £245 million in 2004. They sold them to Liberty International for £380 million in 2007.

With Conway and Brett Palos, Lyons purchased the O2 Centre in 2009.

With Conway, Lyons invested £250 million in two data centres located in Bury Green, Hertfordshire and Chesham, Buckinghamshire.

Lyons also owns properties through St James Capital.

As of 2017, Lyons "runs a US operation that offers money-saving lighting solutions to clients such as BP, Ferrari, Ford and Shell."

Lyons joined Future Energy Solutions as a partner in 2012, which operates across America and Europe, offering money-saving lighting for a variety of businesses. Its clients include Ford, BP and car park giant NCP as well as hotel chains such as Best Western.

Personal life
Lyons previously resided in a mansion in Hampstead, London, which he sold for £43 million in 2010. He now resides in The Bahamas.

References

Living people
People from Hampstead
British expatriates in the Bahamas
English company founders
British real estate businesspeople
1967 births